Louie Says was an American indie rock trio on the RCA Records label. The group consisted of Clark Stiles, Sam Slovick, and Josh Crawley. They released two CDs in 1997; one was a demo EP called Cold to the Touch, the other was their debut (and only) album entitled Gravity, Suffering, Love, and Fate. 

Despite the group's short lived career they produced one notable song – "She".  "She"  was featured in American television shows such as Dawson’s Creek (Episode No. 111) and Buffy the Vampire Slayer (Episode 2x05 – "Reptile Boy") when those shows appeared on the now defunct WB network.

Members
 Clark Stiles – Guitar, Bass, Drums, etc.
 Sam Slovick – Lead vocals
 Josh Crawley – Keyboards and Vocals

Discography
 Cold to the Touch (EP), 1997
 Gravity, Suffering, Love, and Fate, 1997

References

External links
 Louie Says Page on MusicMatch.com

American indie rock groups
RCA Records artists
Musical groups established in 1997
Musical groups disestablished in 1997